Allison Jane Doupe (1954–24 October 2014) was an influential Canadian psychiatrist, biologist, and neuroscientist. She is best known for her pioneering work in avian neurobiology that linked birdsong to human language, showing that birds and humans learn to communicate in similar ways. In 2014, Doupe was awarded the Pradel Research Award by the National Academy of Sciences for her work on neural circuits and information processing in songbirds.

Life
After graduating from McGill University, Doupe obtained her MD and PhD in Neurobiology from Harvard University. She joined the University of California, San Francisco Departments of Psychiatry and Physiology in 1993 as an assistant professor, and was promoted to full professor in 2000.  

In 2008 she was elected as a fellow of the American Academy of Arts and Sciences.

She died on 24 October 2014, of cancer.

Publications

Awards
1993 Klingenstein Fellowship
1993 Searle Scholarship
2012 W. Alden Spencer Award
2013 Cozzarelli Prize by PNAS
2014 Pradel Research Award by the National Academy of Sciences

References

1954 births
2014 deaths
Canadian neuroscientists
McGill University alumni
University of California, San Francisco faculty
Harvard Medical School alumni
Canadian women neuroscientists
Recipients of the Presidential Early Career Award for Scientists and Engineers